Elisabetta Querini (November 12, 1628 in Venice – January 19, 1709 in Venice) was the Dogaressa of Venice by marriage to the Doge Silvestro Valier (r. 1694-1700).

Querini is described as the only Venetian dogaressa of any significance of the 17th century since Morosina Morosini-Grimani. Her consort was said to be known in history mostly through her. Although the Grand Council had, in 1645, abolished the elaborate ceremony for installing a new dogaressa, because of its large expense to the state and to the Doge, Valiero convinced the council to grant an exception.  As such, on March 4, 1694, Elisabetta Querini appeared clad in a cloth of gold robe adorned with sable, with a white veil and corno ducale, (the version of ducal crown worn by the Doge and his wife) adorned with jewels, and a large diamond cross on her chest.  Together Valiero and his wife sat on the throne of Venice and received counselors, ministers, judges, and the capis of the Ten. She also had the traditional Solemn Entry 4 March 1694. She was the last dogaressa to be crowned. Elisabetta used her right as dogaressa to receive foreign dignitaries and accept gifts from them: both this right, as well as the right for a dogaressa to wear a crown, was forbidden after the reign of her spouse in 1700.

Gallery

References 

 Staley, Edgcumbe:  The dogaressas of Venice : The wives of the doges, London : T. W. Laurie, 1910

1628 births
1709 deaths
17th-century Venetian people
17th-century Venetian women
18th-century Venetian people
18th-century Venetian women
Dogaressas of Venice